W. Foulsham & Company Limited is a British publisher founded by William Foulsham in 1819.

It is the current publisher of Old Moore's Almanack, an annual publication first published in 1697, and of Raphael's Ephemeris, which Robert Thomas Cross acquired in the 1870s and edited until his death in 1913.

In 1932 the firm was publishing from 10-11 Red Lion Court, Fleet Street, London E.C.4.

The firm has published a number of book series over the years, including the Do-It-Yourself Series, Foulsham's Pocket Library, Foulsham's Practical Manuals,  the Mayflower Library, and the Pilgrims Library.

References

External links

Book publishing companies of the United Kingdom
1819 establishments in England
Publishing companies established in 1819
British companies established in 1819